Molly Jong-Fast  (born August 19, 1978) is an American writer, journalist, author, political commentator, and podcaster.

Early life 
Jong-Fast is the daughter of novelist Erica Jong and author Jonathan Fast, and the granddaughter of Howard Fast. Her family is Jewish. Her parents divorced when she was young and she was raised as an only child. She attended Barnard College prior to receiving a Master of Fine Arts degree at Bennington College in 2004.

Career
As of November 2021, Jong-Fast is a contributing writer at The Atlantic and at Vogue. She had previously worked as an editor-at-large at The Daily Beast. She is the author of two novels; Normal Girl and The Social Climber's Handbook, and a memoir; Girl [Maladjusted], originally published as The Sex Doctors in the Basement. She is a regular contributor to Playboy, Glamour, The Atlantic and The Bulwark. She began hosting The Daily Beast podcast The New Abnormal in 2020, and is the writer of The Atlantic's Wait, What? newsletter. Kirkus Reviews has described her as "the Joan Rivers for slackers".

Personal life
In 2003, John-Fast married CUNY professor Matthew Adlai Greenfield. They have three children. 

She has written about her experience with Alcoholics Anonymous.

Publications
 Normal Girl (2000). 
 The Sex Doctors in the Basement: True Stories from a Semi-Celebrity Childhood (2005). .
 Girl [Maladjusted]: True Stories from a Semi-Celebrity Childhood (2006). 
 The Social Climber's Handbook: A novel (2011).

References

Further reading

External links
  on the Fediverse

1978 births
Living people
American biographers
American memoirists
American women memoirists
American women novelists
Jewish American novelists
20th-century American novelists
21st-century American non-fiction writers
20th-century American women writers
21st-century American women writers
20th-century American non-fiction writers
Bennington College alumni
Barnard College alumni